Sorbus microphylla, the small-leaf rowan, is a species of Sorbus found in the Himalayas and China. It is probably a species aggregate. The berries are eaten by red pandas (Ailurus fulgens).

References

microphylla
Plants described in 1873